Expecting Amy is an American documentary miniseries directed by Alexander Hammer that follows Amy Schumer through her pregnancy and hyperemesis gravidarum, including the creation of her stand-up special Amy Schumer: Growing. Schumer also serves as an executive producer. It premiered on July 9, 2020 on HBO Max.

Production
In October 2019, it was announced Amy Schumer would serve as executive producer and appear with her husband Chris Fischer in a documentary about her pregnancy, life, and career, directed by Alexander Hammer for HBO Max. Bridget Everett, Rachel Feinstein, Kevin Kane and Kim Caramele would also appear.

Episodes

References

External links

2020 American television series debuts
2020s American documentary television series
2020s American television miniseries
HBO Max original programming
Works by Amy Schumer
Pregnancy-themed television shows